Hong Kong Electronics Fair (Autumn Edition) is organised by the Hong Kong Trade Development Council (HKTDC) and to be held at the Hong Kong Convention and Exhibition Centre in October every year. One of the fair's highlights is the Hall of Fame – a special section dedicated to high-quality electronic products that are distinguished by their design and function. The fair is organised into key thematic zones ranging from audio-visual products to navigation systems, and from home appliances to telecommunications products. At Technology Exchange Zone, Hong Kong's leading research facilities and companies display their latest technology ideas. In addition, a number of testing, inspection & certification services companies will exhibit at the fair, presenting an array of related services for the electronics industry.

References
http://www.theaustralian.com.au/business/media/d-tv-steals-the-show-in-electronics-fairs-vision-of-future/story-e6frg996-1225816771048
http://www.topunion-fe.com/news-and-events/hong-kong-electronics-fair-autumn-edition
http://www.ee.cityu.edu.hk/main/alumni/eeconcord/Concord20_p5-6.pdf
https://web.archive.org/web/20110507075455/http://www.allan.com.hk/go/news/recent-events-1/hong-kong-electronics-fair-autumn-edition-2009
HighBeam

External links
Official website
Press releases

Related events
Int'l ICT Expo
Hong Kong Int'l Lighting Fair (Autumn Edition)
Hong Kong Electronics Fair (Spring Edition)
electronicAsia

Trade fairs in Hong Kong